Patricia Lynn Hersh (born 1973) is an American mathematician who works as a professor of mathematics at the University of Oregon. Her research concerns algebraic combinatorics, topological combinatorics, and the connections between combinatorics and other fields of mathematics.

Education and career
Hersh graduated magna cum laude with an A.B. in mathematics and computer science from Harvard University in 1995, with a senior thesis supervised by Persi Diaconis. 
She completed her Ph.D. in 1999 at the Massachusetts Institute of Technology, under the supervision of Richard P. Stanley; her dissertation was Decomposition and Enumeration in Partially Ordered Sets.

After postdoctoral positions at the University of Washington, University of Michigan, and Mathematical Sciences Research Institute in Berkeley, California, she joined the faculty at Indiana University Bloomington in 2004,  moved to North Carolina State University in 2008, and then to the University of Oregon in 2019.

Recognition
In 2010, Hersh won the Ruth I. Michler Memorial Prize of the Association for Women in Mathematics, funding a visiting position for her at Cornell University. 
In 2015 she was elected as a fellow of the American Mathematical Society "for contributions to algebraic and topological combinatorics, and for service to the mathematical community".

References

External links
Home page

Patricia Hersh's Author Profile Page on MathSciNet.

1973 births
Living people
21st-century American mathematicians
American women mathematicians
Combinatorialists
Harvard University alumni
Massachusetts Institute of Technology alumni
Indiana University faculty
North Carolina State University faculty
Fellows of the American Mathematical Society
21st-century women mathematicians
University of Oregon faculty
21st-century American women